Goude or Goudé may refer to:

Goude
Alex Goude (born 1975), French journalist, television host, author, and actor
Ingrid Goude (born 1937), Swedish model and film actress 
Jane Goude (1891–1966), American actress, Chautauqua performer, and clubwoman
Jean-Paul Goude (born 1940), French graphic designer, illustrator, photographer, and advertising film director
Jean-Philippe Goude (born 1952), French composer and keyboardist

Goudé
Charles Blé Goudé (born 1972), Ivorian politician, later charged with war crimes
Narcisse "Goudé" Sadoua, or just Goudé, musician, member of band Magic System

See also 
 Goud
 Gowd (disambiguation)